Dražen Zlovarić (born 23 March 1989) is a Serbian professional basketball coach and former player who played as a power forward. He currently works as an assistant coach for the Arizona State Sun Devils.

Playing career 
Zlovarić played university basketball at the University of Georgia and the University of Tennessee at Chattanooga. After returning to Europe, he had stints with Best Balıkesir, Zepter Vienna, and Igokea.

On 19 March 2015, it was announced that Zlovarić decided to finish his playing career and concentrate on continuing his studies and pursuing a career outside professional basketball.

Coaching career 
On 9 May 2017, Zlovarić was announced as an assistant coach on Cleveland State University's men's basketball staff under head coach Dennis Felton.

In September 2018, Zlovarić was hired by Arizona State to be assistant coach under head coach Bobby Hurley.

References

External links 
 Profile at aba-liga.com
 Profile at eurobasket.com
 Profile at csuvikings.com

1989 births
Living people
ABA League players
BC Zepter Vienna players
Cleveland State Vikings men's basketball coaches
Chattanooga Mocs men's basketball players
Croatian expatriate basketball people in the United States
Georgia Bulldogs basketball players
KK Igokea players
People from Osijek
Power forwards (basketball)
Serbian expatriate basketball people in Austria
Serbian expatriate basketball people in Bosnia and Herzegovina
Serbian expatriate basketball people in Turkey
Serbian expatriate basketball people in the United States
Serbian men's basketball players
Serbs of Croatia
Yugoslav Wars refugees